Reuben Charles Gant (born April 12, 1952) is a former professional American football tight end in the National Football League (NFL) for the Buffalo Bills. He played college football at Oklahoma State University.

References

External links
http://voicesofoklahoma.com/interview/gant-reuben/ Voices of Oklahoma interview with Reuben Gant.] First person interview conducted on June 16, 2010 with Reuben Gant. 

1952 births
Living people
Sportspeople from Tulsa, Oklahoma
American football tight ends
Oklahoma State Cowboys football players
Buffalo Bills players